This is a list of the named geological faults affecting the rocks of England. See the main article on faults for a fuller treatment of fault types and nomenclature but in brief, the main types are normal faults, reverse faults, thrusts or thrust faults and strike-slip faults. Many faults may have acted as both normal faults at one time and as reverse or thrust faults at another and may or may not have also incorporated some degree of strike-slip movement too.

There are also a few 'disturbances'. These linear features are a combination of faults and folds - the relative importance of faulting and folding varying along the length of each disturbance.

Key to tables 
Column 1 indicates the name of the fault. Note that different authors may use different names for the same fault or a section of it. Conversely the same name may be applied to more than one fault, particularly in the case of smaller faults which are geographically distant from each another. Some composite names e.g. Abbotsbury - Ridgeway Fault include individual faults e.g. Abbotsbury Fault and Ridgeway Fault appearing elsewhere in the list but are included since they have been referred to differently by different authors.
Column 2 indicates the OS grid reference of the approximate midpoint of certain faults. Note that the mapped extent of a fault may not accurately reflect its actual extent.
Column 3 indicates the county in which the fault occurs. Some traverse two or more counties of course.
Column 4 indicates on which sheet, if any, of the British Geological Survey's 1:50,000 / 1" scale geological map series of England and Wales, the fault is shown and named (either on map/s or cross-section/s or both). A handful of BGS maps at other scales are listed too.
Column 5 indicates a selection of publications in which references to the fault may be found. See references section for full details of publication.

Alphabetical lists of faults

A

B

C

D

E

F

G

H

I,J

K

L

M

N

O

P,Q

R

S

T

U,V

W

X,Y,Z

References

Maps
 1:625,000 scale geological map 2007, Bedrock Geology UK South, British Geological Survey, Keyworth, Notts (UK (south) 625K)
 1:250,000 scale geological map Mid Wales and the Marches, British Geological Survey, Keyworth, Notts (MW & M 250K)
 1:63,360 scale geological map Bristol Special sheet, British Geological Survey, Keyworth, Notts (Bristol Special 1" .)
 various of 1:50,000 scale geological maps of England and Wales, British Geological Survey, Keyworth, Notts (E & W no.)
 1:25,000 scale sheet Church Stretton in Classic Areas of British geology series, British Geological Survey, Keyworth, Notts (Ch Stret: 25K)

Books
 Barton et al. 2011. Geology of South Dorset and South-east Devon and its World Heritage Coast, Special Memoir of the British Geological Survey (Mem E&W 328etc)
 Brenchley, P.J. & Rawson, P.F. (eds) 2006. The Geology of England and Wales, (2nd edn) The Geological Society, London (Brenchley & Rawson 2006)
 Cope, J.C.W. 2012 GA Guide no 22: Geology of the Dorset Coast, The Geologists' Association  (GA Guide22)
 Hamblin, R.J.O. & Coppack, B.C., 1995 Geology of Telford and the Coalbrookdale Coalfield, Memoir of the British Geological Survey, parts of sheets 152 & 153 (England and Wales), HMSO (Mem (E&W 152/153)
 Smith et al. 2005 Structure & Evolution of the south-west Pennine Basin and adjacent area. Subsurface memoir of the British Geological Survey. (Smith et al. 2005)
 Toghill, P. 2006 Geology of Shropshire (2nd edn) Crowood Press, Wilts (Toghill P 2006)
 Webby, B.D. 1965 Proceedings of the Geologists' Association volume 76, part 1 (Webby, B.D. 1965)
 Welch, F.B.A. & Trotter, F.M. 1961 Geology of the Country around Monmouth and Chepstow, HMSO (explanation of 1" geol. sheets 233 & 250 (England and Wales) (Welch, FBA & Trotter, FM 1961)
 British Regional Geology: Northern England (BGS:BRG7)
 British Regional Geology: The Pennines & adjacent areas (BGS:BRG8)
 British Regional Geology: Eastern England from the Tees to The Wash (BGS:BRG9)
 British Regional Geology: Central England (BGS:BRG10)
 Earp, J.R. & Hains, B.A. 1971 British Regional Geology: The Welsh Borderland (3rd edn), London, HMSO for British Geological Survey (BGS:BRG11)
 Melville, R.V. & Freshney, E.C. 1982 British Regional Geology: The Hampshire Basin and adjoining areas (4th edn). London HMSO for the British Geological Survey (BGS:BRG15)
 British Regional Geology: Bristol & Gloucester District (BGS:BRG16)
 A Guide to the Geology of Martley (prepared for Teme Valley Geological Society by Herefordshire & Worcs Earth Heritage Trust) (Guide Geol. of Martley)

See also
 List of geological faults of Northern Ireland
 List of geological faults of Scotland
 List of geological faults of Wales
 List of geological folds in Great Britain
 Geological structure of Great Britain

Geology of England
Structural geology
England
Geological faults
Geological faults of England